Prominea is a genus of moths of the family Erebidae. The genus was erected by Max Saalmüller in 1891. Both the genus are found on Madagascar.

Species
Prominea jeanneli Viette, 1954
Prominea porrecta (Saalmüller, 1880)

References

Saalmüller, M. & von Heyden, L. (1891). Lepidopteren von Madagascar. Zweite Abtheilung. Heterocera: Noctuae, Geometrae, Microlepidoptera: 247–531, pls. 7–14.

Calpinae
Noctuoidea genera
Taxa named by Max Saalmüller